Marco Pedacca, O.S.B. (died 27 January 1602) was a Roman Catholic prelate who served as Bishop of Lacedonia (1584–1602).

Biography
Marco Pedacca was ordained a priest in the Order of Saint Benedict.
On 14 March 1584, he was appointed during the papacy of Pope Gregory XIII as Bishop of Lacedonia.
On 6 May 1584, he was consecrated bishop by Thomas Goldwell, Bishop of Saint Asaph, with Giovanni Battista Santorio, Bishop of Alife, and Ignazio Danti (bishop), Bishop of Alatri, serving as co-consecrators. 
He served as Bishop of Lacedonia until his death on 27 January 1602.

References

External links and additional sources
 (for Chronology of Bishops) 
 (for Chronology of Bishops) 

16th-century Italian Roman Catholic bishops
17th-century Italian Roman Catholic bishops
Bishops appointed by Pope Gregory XIII
1602 deaths
Benedictine bishops